FHA may refer to:
 Fair Housing Act, part of the United States Civil Rights Act of 1968
 Federal Housing Administration, a United States government agency 
 Filamentous haemagglutinin adhesin
 Forkhead-associated domain
 Foundation for Humanity's Adulthood; see Tim Macartney-Snape
 Fraser Health Authority, a publicly funded health care Regions in British Columbia, Canada
 Full Height Anamorphic widescreen, a video technique used to store a 16:9 picture in a 4:3 frame
 Functional hypothalamic amenorrhea
 SS Führungshauptamt, the operational headquarters of the SS in Nazi Germany